Gnathopraxithea sarryi is a species of beetle in the family Cerambycidae, the only species in the genus Gnathopraxithea.

References

Torneutini
Monotypic Cerambycidae genera